Tom Chambers (October 11, 1943 – December 11, 2013) was an American lawyer who served as an associate justice of the Washington State Supreme Court from 2000 to 2012.

Early life and education
Chambers grew up in Yakima, where he worked at his father's automobile repair garage. He graduated from Wapato High School in 1962, and then attended Yakima Valley Community College. In 1966, he graduated with a B.A. degree from Washington State University, and in 1969 received a J.D. degree from the University of Washington School of Law.

Legal and judicial career

While in private practice, Chambers practiced personal injury law. On the bench, he continued his commitment to individual rights. Two of his notable Supreme Court cases were Braam v. State of Washington (2003), concerning foster children's constitutional rights, and State v. A.N.J. (2010), setting standards for public defender case loads.

Chambers served as president of both the Washington State Bar Association, 1996–1997, and the Washington State Trial Lawyers Association, 1985–1986.

References

External links
 Personal website
Biography on Washington State Courts website

1943 births
2013 deaths
People from Yakima, Washington
Lawyers from Seattle
Justices of the Washington Supreme Court
Washington State University alumni
University of Washington School of Law alumni
21st-century American lawyers
21st-century American judges
People from Wapato, Washington
20th-century American judges
20th-century American lawyers